Hobart and William Smith Colleges are private liberal arts colleges in Geneva, New York. They trace their origins to Geneva Academy established in 1797. Students can choose from 45 majors and 68 minors with degrees in Bachelor of Arts, Bachelor of Science, Master of Arts in Teaching, Master of Science in Management, and Master of Arts in Higher Education Leadership. The colleges have graduated 35 Fulbright Scholars, 3 Rhodes Scholars, and numerous Marshall Scholars, Rangel Fellows, Truman Scholars, Emmy, and Pulitzer awardees as well as United States senators, House representatives, and a United States Supreme Court justice. Hobart and William Smith Colleges is a member of the New York Six Liberal Arts Consortium, an association of highly selective liberal arts colleges. It is frequently ranked among the top 100 liberal arts colleges in the United States. 

The colleges were originally separate institutions – Hobart College for men and William Smith College for women – that shared close bonds and a contiguous campus.  Founded as Geneva College in 1822, Hobart College was renamed in honor of its founder John Henry Hobart, bishop of Episcopal Diocese of New York in 1852. William Smith College was founded in 1908 by Geneva philanthropist and nurseryman William Smith at the suggestion of numerous suffragettes and activists including Elizabeth Smith Miller and her daughter Anne Fitzhugh Miller. In 1943, William Smith College was elevated from its original status as a department of Hobart College to an independent college and the two colleges established a joint corporate identity. They are officially chartered as "Hobart and William Smith Colleges" and informally referred to as "HWS" or "the Colleges." Although united in one corporation with many shared resources and overlapping organization, they have each retained their own traditions. 

Today, students are free to participate in each of the colleges' customs and traditions based on their preferred gender identities. Students can graduate with diplomas issued by Hobart College, William Smith College, or Hobart and William Smith Colleges.

History

Hobart and William Smith Colleges, private colleges in Geneva, New York, began on the western frontier as the Geneva Academy.  After some setbacks and disagreement among trustees, the academy suspended operations in 1817. By the time Bishop John Henry Hobart, of the Episcopal Diocese of New York, first visited the city of Geneva in 1818, the doors of Geneva Academy had just closed. Yet, Geneva was a bustling Upstate New York city on the main land and stage coach route to the West. Bishop Hobart had a plan to reopen the academy at a new location, raise a public subscription for the construction of a stone building, and elevate the school to college status. Roughly following this plan, Geneva Academy reopened as Geneva College in 1822 with conditional grant funds made available from Trinity Church in New York City. Geneva College was renamed Hobart College in 1852 in honor of its founder, Bishop Hobart.

William Smith College was founded in 1908, originally as William Smith College for Women. Its namesake and founder was a wealthy local nurseryman, benefactor of the arts and sciences, and philanthropist. The school arose from negotiations between William Smith, who sought to establish a women's college, and Hobart College President Langdon C. Stewardson, who sought to redirect Smith's philanthropy towards Hobart College. Smith, however, was intent on establishing a coordinate, nonsectarian women's college, which, when realized, coincidentally gave Hobart access to new facilities and professors. The two student bodies were educated separately in the early years, even though William Smith College was a department of Hobart College for organizational purposes until 1943. That year, after a gradual relaxation of academic separation, William Smith College was formally recognized as an independent college, co-equal with Hobart. Both colleges were reflected in a new, joint corporate identity.

Early history and growth

Geneva Academy
Geneva Academy was founded in 1796 when Geneva was just a small frontier settlement. It is believed to be the first school formed in Geneva. The area was considered "the gateway to Genesee County" and was in the early stages of development from the wilderness.

In 1809, the trustees of the academy appointed Rev. Andrew Wilson, formerly of the University of Glasgow in Scotland as head of the school. He remained until 1812 when Ransom Hubell, a graduate of Union College, was made principal.

Geneva College
The Regents granted the full charter on February 8, 1825, and at that time, Geneva Academy officially changed its name to Geneva College. Rev. J. Adams was president of the college as of 1827.

The "English Course," as it was known, was a radical departure from long established educational usage and represented the beginning of the college work pattern found today.

Geneva Medical College

Geneva Medical College was founded on September 15, 1834, as a separate department of Geneva College. The medical school was founded by Edward Cutbush, who also served as the first dean for the school.

Elizabeth Blackwell

In an era when the prevailing conventional wisdom was no woman could withstand the intellectual and emotional rigors of a medical education, Elizabeth Blackwell, (1821–1910) applied to and was rejected – or simply ignored – by 29 medical schools before being admitted in 1847 to the Medical Institution of Geneva College.

The medical faculty, largely opposed to her admission but seemingly unwilling to take responsibility for the decision, decided to submit the matter to a vote of the students. The men of the college voted to admit her.

Blackwell graduated two years later, on January 23, 1849, at the top of her class to become the first woman doctor in the Northern hemisphere. "The occasion marked the culmination of years of trial and disappointment for Miss Blackwell, and was a key event in the struggle for the emancipation of women in the nineteenth century in America."

Blackwell went on to found the New York Infirmary for Women and Children and had a role in the creation of its medical college. She then returned to her native England and helped found the National Health Society and taught at the first college of medicine for women to be established there.

Hobart College
The school was known as Geneva College until 1852, when it was renamed in memory of its most forceful advocate and founder, Bishop Hobart, to Hobart Free College. In 1860, the name was shortened to Hobart College.

Hobart College of the 19th century was the first American institution of higher learning to establish a three-year "English Course" of study to educate young men destined for such practical occupations as "journalism, agriculture, merchandise, mechanism, and manufacturing", while at the same time maintaining a traditional four-year "classical course" for those intending to enter "the learned professions."  It also was the first college in America to have a dean of the college.

Notable 19th-century alumni included Albert James Myer, Class of 1847, a military officer assigned to run the United States Weather Bureau at its inception, was a founding member of the International Meteorological Organization, and helped birth the U.S. Signal Corps, and for whom Fort Myer, Virginia, is named; General E. S. Bragg of the Class of 1848, colonel of the Sixth Wisconsin Regiment and a brigadier general in command of the Iron Brigade who served one term in Congress and later was ambassador to Mexico and consul general of the U.S. in Cuba; two other 1848 graduates, Clarence A. Seward and Thomas M. Griffith, who were assistant secretary of state and builder of the first national railroad across the Mississippi River, respectively; and Charles J. Folger, Class of 1836, a United States Secretary of the Treasury in the 1880s.

Until the mid-20th century, Hobart was strongly affiliated with the Episcopal Church and produced many of its clergy. While this affiliation continues to the present, the last Episcopal clergyman to serve as President of Hobart (1956–1966) was Louis Melbourne Hirshson. Since then, the president of the colleges has been a layperson.

During World War II, Hobart College was one of 131 colleges and universities nationally that took part in the V-12 Navy College Training Program which offered students a path to a Navy commission.

Founding of William Smith College
Toward the end of the 19th century, Hobart College was on the brink of bankruptcy. It was through the presidency of Langdon Stewardson the college obtained a new donor, nurseryman William Smith.  Smith had built the Smith Opera House in downtown Geneva and the Smith Observatory on his property when he became interested in founding a college for women, a plan he pursued to the point of breaking ground before realizing it was beyond his means. As publicized in The College Signal on October 7, 1903, "William Smith, a millionaire nurseryman, will found and endow a college for women at Geneva, N. Y., to be known as the William Smith College for Women The institution will be in the most beautiful section. One building is to cost $150,000. Mr. Smith maintains the Smith observatory there." In 1903, Hobart College President Langdon C. Stewardson learned of Smith's interest and, for two years, attempted to convince him to make Hobart College the object of his philanthropy. With enrollments down and its resources strained, Hobart's future depended upon an infusion of new funds.

Unable to convince Smith to provide direct assistance to Hobart, President Stewardson redirected the negotiations toward founding a coordinate institution for women, a plan that appealed to the philanthropist. On December 13, 1906, he formalized his intentions; two years later William Smith School for Women – a coordinate, nonsectarian women's college – enrolled its first class of 18 students. That charter class grew to 20 members before its graduation in 1912.

In addition, Smith's gift made possible construction of the Smith Hall of Science, to be used by both colleges, and permitted the hiring, also in 1908, of three new faculty members who would teach in areas previously unavailable in the curriculum: biology, sociology, and psychology.

World War II
Between 1943 and 1945, Hobart College trained almost 1,000 men in the U.S. Navy's V-12 program, many of whom returned to complete their college educations when the post-World War II GI Bill swelled the enrollments of American colleges and universities. In 1948, three of those veterans – William F. Scandling, Harry W. Anderson, and W. P. Laughlin – took over operation of the Hobart dining hall. Their fledgling business was expanded the next year to include William Smith College; after their graduation, in 1949, it grew to serve other colleges and universities across the country, eventually becoming Saga Corporation, a nationwide provider of institutional food services.

Campus

Layout

The campus is notable for the style of Jacobean Gothic architecture represented by many of its buildings, notably Coxe Hall, which houses the President's Office and other administrative departments. In contrast, the earliest buildings were built in the Federal style and the chapel is Neo-Gothic.

 The Quad, the core of the Hobart campus, was formed by the construction of Medbery, Coxe, and Demarest. Several years later, Arthur Nash, a Hobart professor, designed Williams Hall, which would be constructed in the gap between Medbery and Coxe. The Quad is formed to the east by Trinity and Geneva Hall, the two original College buildings, and to the south by the Science compound, and Napier Hall. Geneva Hall (1822) and Trinity Hall (1837) were added to the National Register of Historic Places in 1973. In 2016, the schools announced they were going solar by building two solar farms to create enough electricity for about 50 percent of HWS' needs.

The Hill (or William Smith Hill) is a prominent feature of the historic William Smith campus. Located at the top of a large sloping hill to the West of Seneca Lake and the Hobart Quad, the Hill houses three historic William Smith dorms, and one built in the 1960s (Comstock, Miller, Blackwell, and Hirshson Houses). At its peak resides William Smith's all female dorms. The Hill was the site originally conceived for William Smith College. Unveiled in 2008 for the William Smith Centennial is a statue of the college's founder and benefactor, William Smith.

A 15 million dollar expansion of the Scandling Campus Center was completed in autumn 2008.  This renovation added over 17,000 additional square feet, including an expanded cafe, a new post office, and more meeting areas. In 2016 the Gearan Center for Performing Arts was completed at a cost of 28 million dollars; the largest project in the history of the colleges.

Key buildings

Coxe Hall, serves as the main administrative hub of campus. Constructed in 1901, the building is named after Bishop Arthur Clevland Coxe, a benefactor of the school, and houses the president's office, Bartlett Theater, The Pub, and a classroom wing, which was added in the 1920s. Arthur Cleveland Coxe was closely affiliated with the school. The building was designed by Clinton and Russell Architects.

Gearan Center for the Performing Arts, named in honor of President Mark D Gearan and Mary Herlihy Gearan, was in 2016.  It includes a lobby that links three flexible performance and rehearsal spaces for theater, music and dance. Also included are faculty offices, practice and recital rooms and a film screening room.

Scandling Campus Center, named after William F. Scandling '49, renovated and expanded in 2009, houses Saga (the dining hall), the post office, offices of student activities, a cafe, and Vandervort room (a large event space).

Gulick Hall, was built in 1951 as part of the post-war "mini-boom" that also included the construction of the Hobart "mini-quad" dormitories Durfee, Bartlett, and Hale (each named for a 19th-century Hobart College president). Gulick Hall originally housed the campus dining services and, later, the Office of the Registrar.  Completely renovated in 1991, Gulick now houses both the Office of the Registrar and the Psychology department, which was moved from Smith Hall in 1991 prior to its renovation in 1992.

Stern Hall, named for the lead donor, Herbert J. Stern '58, was completed in 2004. It houses the departments of economics, political science, anthropology & sociology, environmental studies and Asian languages and cultures.

Smith Hall, built in 1907, originally housed both the Biology and Psychology Departments.  It is now home to the Dean's Offices of both colleges, along with the departmental offices of Writing and Rhetoric and the various modern language departments.  Smith Hall was the first building constructed with funds from William Smith on the William Smith College campus, but it is also the first building that has always been shared by both colleges.

Williams Hall, completed in 1907, housed the first campus gymnasium and, after the construction of Bristol gymnasium, served several other lives as campus post office, book store, IT services and location of the Music Department.

Demarest Hall, connected to St. John's Chapel by St. Mark's Tower, houses the departments of Religious Studies and English and Comparative Literature as well as the Women's Studies Program.  Also home to the Blackwell Room, named in honor of Elizabeth Blackwell (once used as study area and library, the space is now used for classrooms in the absence of more intentional planning for classroom space),  Demarest was designed by Richard Upjohn's son, Richard M. Upjohn. (Upjohn's grandson, Hobart Upjohn would design several of the college's buildings as well). Demarest served as the college's library until the construction of the Warren Hunting Smith Library in the early 1970s. In the 1960s it was expanded to hold the college's growing number of volumes. Today, it also houses the Fisher Center for the Study of Gender and Justice, an intellectual center led by such scholar faculty as Dunbar Moodie (Sociology), Betty Bayer (Women's Studies), and Jodi Dean (Political Science).

Trinity Hall built in 1837, was the second of the colleges' buildings. Trinity Hall was designed by college president Benjamin Hale, who taught architecture. Trinity served as a dormitory and a library, but it was converted into a space for classrooms, labs, and offices later in the 19th century. It presently is home to the Salisbury Center for Career Services.

Merrit Hall, completed in 1879, was built on the ruins of the old medical college. Merrit was the first science building on campus and housed the chemistry labs. Merrit also housed a clock atop the quad side of the building. On the eve of the Hobart centennial in 1922, students climbed to the top and made the bell strike 100 times. Merrit Hall was also one of the first buildings shared by Hobart and William Smith. Today Merrit Hall houses a lecture hall and faculty offices.
St. John's Chapel, designed by Richard Upjohn the architect of Trinity Church in New York City, served as the religious hub of the campus, replacing Polynomous, the original campus chapel. In the 1960s, St. John's was connected to Demarest Hall by St. Marks Tower.

Houghton House, the mansion, known for its Victorian elements, is home to the Art and Architecture departments. The country mansion was built, in the 1880s by William J. King. It was purchased in 1901 by the wife of Charles Vail (maiden name Helen Houghton), Hobart graduate and professor, as the family's summer home. Mrs. Vail remodeled the Victorian mansion's interior to the present classical decor in 1913.  The family's "town home" is 624 S. Main Street and is now the Sigma Phi fraternity. Helen Vail's heirs donated the house and its grounds to the colleges to be used as a woman's dormitory. After many years as a student dorm, the house became home to the art department after the original art studio was razed to make way for the new Scandling Campus Center. The building is now home to the Davis Art Gallery, with lecture rooms, multiple faculty offices, and architecture studios on the top floor.

Katherine D. Elliot Hall, was constructed in 2006. The "Elliot" houses  contains art classrooms; offices; studios for painting, photography, and printing; and wood and metal shops.

Goldstein Family Carriage House, was built by William J. King in 1882 and was renovated in 2006 to house a digital imaging lab and a photo studio with a darkroom for black-and-white photography.

Warren Hunting Smith Library, in the center of the campus, houses 385,000 volumes, 12,000 periodicals, and more than 8,000 VHS and DVD videos.  In 1997, the library underwent a major renovation, undergoing several improvements, such as the addition of multimedia centers, and the addition to its south side of the L. Thomas Melly Academic Center, a spacious, modern location for "round the clock" study.

Napier Hall, attached to the Rosenberg Hall, houses several classrooms and was completed in 1994.

Rosenberg Hall, named for Henry A. Rosenberg (Hobart '52), is an annex of Lansing and Eaton Hall, the original science buildings. Rosenberg houses many labs and offices.

Lansing Hall, built in 1954, is home to Sciences and Mathematics. The building is named for John Ernest Lansing, Professor of Chemistry (1905–1948), who twice served as acting president.

Eaton Hall, is named for Elon Howard Eaton, Professor of Biology (1908–1935). Eaton, one of New York's outstanding ornithologists, was one of the professors brought to campus with William Smith grant funds. Eaton Hall is a part of the science complex at the south end of the Hobart Quad, which consists of Lansing, Rosenberg, and Napier.

Dormitories

Men's dorms

Geneva Hall, built in 1822, is the college's first building, and the cornerstone site designated by the School's founder, Bishop John Henry Hobart. The building is one of the oldest academic building in continuous use, having served as a dormitory, among other uses, since its completion. The building has inscribed into its quoins, and alongside the perimeter of its facade, plaques which list the graduates of classes dating back to the 19th century.

The Mini Quad, consisting of three buildings, Durfee, Hale, and Bartlett, houses about 150 Hobart students.  Since the 2006 academic year, the dorms have become coeducational, with at least one floor housing William Smith Students.

Hale Hall is named for Benjamin Hale, president of Hobart College from 1836 to 1858.

Bartlett Hall was named after the Reverend Murray Bartlett, who served as fourteenth president of Hobart College from 1919 to 1936

Durfee Hall was named after William Pitt Durfee, who from 1884 to 1929 served as Professor of Mathematics and Chair of the Mathematics Department. He was the first dean of a liberal arts college and served as acting president of the Colleges four times.

Women's dorms

Blackwell House was designed and built in 1860 by Richard Upjohn as a residence for William Douglass, who served as a trustee of Hobart College. The house was purchased in 1908 as the first William Smith dormitory. The house still houses William Smith students and is known for its grand Victorian features from fireplaces, to chandeliers, to large old windows. Though rarely recognized as such, the house is named for Elizabeth Blackwell, an early graduate of what became the Colleges.

Comstock House was designed by Richard Upjohn's grandson, Hobart Upjohn, in 1932.  Comstock is a women's dormitory named for Anna Botsford Comstock, friend of William Smith and the first woman to be named a member of the board of trustees.

Miller House was William Smith College's second dormitory. Miller was designed by Arthur Nash, professor and grandson of Arthur Cleveland Coxe. Nash also designed Smith Hall and Williams Hall. This house honors Elizabeth Smith Miller, a leader in the women's movement.

Hirshson House, completed in 1962, was named for the president of the colleges, Louis Melbourne Hirshson, the last Episcopal clergy person to serve in that capacity. The building is home to William Smith students.

Coed dorms

Medbery Hall is an original Hobart College dorm dating from the 1900. Medbery defines the right side of the Hobart Quadrangle. Designed by Clinton and Russell architects at the same time as Coxe Hall, the two buildings share similarity in their Jacobean Gothic style. Medbery is adorned with a recognizable Flemish roofline. Medbery was designed without long hallways "conductive to rioting" and mischief, such as rolling a cannonball down the hallway. Such mischief was experienced in the other two dormitories on campus, Geneva and Trinity Halls.

Jackson, Potter, Rees, together known as JPR for short (and once dubbed "superdorm"), the three identical buildings create their own quad in the south end of campus. The dorms were built in 1966 and are named after various historical figures of Hobart College. The complex houses about 230 first-year and upper class Hobart and William Smith students. The building was completely renovated in 2005 to include quad living spaces (two double bed rooms connected by a common living room) and open lounge spaces and lounges on every floor.

Jackson Hall is named for Abner Jackson, president of the Hobart in the middle of the 19th century.  Jackson would go on to become president of Trinity College in Connecticut, where he would be the principal designer of its present campus.

Rees Hall is named for Major James Rees, an early settler and landowner in Geneva and an acquaintance of George Washington.

Potter Hall is named for John Milton Potter, President of Hobart and William Smith Colleges from 1942 to 1947.

The Village at Odell's Pond is a collection of apartment style dorms available to upperclassmen at the colleges. The units have either four or five bedrooms, 2 bathrooms, a living room and a kitchen.

Emerson Hall was built in 1969.  The rooms are designed as suites, with two doubles and two singles and a common living room and bathroom.

Caird Hall was built, along with deCordova, in 2005. The dorm has provisions for singles, doubles, and quads, and is often desired by students due to the separate temperature controls in each room.  The ground floor hosts a lounge area with both gaming and fitness equipment for students.

deCordova Hall was built, along with Caird, in 2005. The dorm has provisions for singles, doubles, and quads, and is often desired by students due to the separate temperature controls in each room.  The ground floor has a lounge area for students, as well as the deCordova cafe.

The surrounding ecosystem plays a major role in the Colleges' curriculum and acquisitions.  The Colleges own the  Hanley Biological Field Station and Preserve on neighboring Cayuga Lake and hosts the Finger Lakes Institute, a non-profit institute focusing on education and ecological preservation for the Finger Lakes area.

On Seneca Lake one will find the William Scandling, a Hobart and William Smith  research vessel used to monitor lake conditions and in the conduct of student and faculty research.

The Colleges also own and operate WEOS-FM and WHWS-LP, public radio stations broadcasting throughout the Finger Lakes and worldwide, on the web.

Academics
Hobart and William Smith Colleges offer the degrees of Bachelor of Arts, Bachelor of Science, and Master of Arts in Teaching. The colleges follow the semester calendar, have a student to faculty ratio of 10:1 and average class size of 16.  Hobart and William Smith Colleges are accredited by the Middle States Association of Colleges and Schools and The University of the State of New York Its most popular majors, by 2021 graduates, were:
Economics (82)
Mass Communication/Media Studies (42)
Psychology (41)
Biology/Biological Sciences (34)
History (31)
Political Science & Government (30)

Curriculum 

The curriculum was last reviewed and revised in the 2014–15 academic year. Voted on by the faculty, the curriculum adopted the animating principle: Explore. Collaborate. Act. The revisions also adopted a Writing Enriched Curriculum model, the implementation of capstone experiences across all programs and departments and enhanced the First Year Experience. Specifically, to graduate from Hobart and William Smith Colleges, students must:
Pass 32 academic courses, including a First-Year Seminar
Complete the requirements for an academic major, including a capstone course or experience, and an academic minor (or second major). Students cannot major and minor in the same subject.
Complete a course of study, designed in consultation with a faculty adviser, which addresses each of the eight educational goals:
 Critical Thinking
 Communication
 Quantitative Reasoning
 Scientific Inquiry
 Artistic Process
 Social Inequalities
 Cultural Difference
 Ethical Judgment

First-Year Seminar 
First-Year Seminars are discussion-centered, interdisciplinary and collaborative. The only required course at HWS, seminar classes are small – usually about 15 students. Through the First-Year Seminar students:
 Develop critical thinking and communication skills
 Understand the Colleges’ intellectual and ethical values
 Establish a strong network of relationships with peers and mentors

Seminar topics vary each year, as do the professors who teach them. Many First-Year Seminars are linked to a Learning Community. Students enrolled in a Learning Community take one or more courses together. They also live together on the same floor of a co-ed residence hall and attend some of the same lectures and field trips.

Global education 
More than 60% of Hobart and William Smith students participate in off-campus study before they graduate. The Colleges maintain a robust menu of programs, 50+ sites on 6 continents, offering a wide array of options in different academic disciplines around the world. Admission to these programs is competitive.

In the 2020 edition of The Princeton Review's Best 385 Colleges, Hobart and William Smith Colleges study abroad program is ranked third on the “Most Popular Study Abroad” list, marking four years in a row that HWS has been a top-10 study abroad school (No. 7 in 2017 and No. 1 in the 2018 and 2019 editions).

President Joyce P. Jacobsen 
On July 1, 2019, Joyce P. Jacobsen began serving as the 29th President of Hobart College and the 18th of William Smith College.  She is the first woman to serve as president of Hobart and William Smith Colleges.

Rankings

In its 2020 edition, U.S. News & World Report ranks Hobart and William Smith Colleges as tied for 72nd best liberal arts college in the U.S. and tied for 60th in "Best Undergraduate Teaching".

In 2019, Forbes rated it 190th overall in "America's Top Colleges," which ranked 650 national universities, liberal arts colleges and service academies.

Trias Writers-in-Residence
Founded in 2011 with a grant from alumnus Peter Trias, Hobart and William Smith Colleges established the Trias Writer-in-Residence, which brings renowned authors to campus for a year to mentor undergraduate creative writing students. Former writers in residence have included Mary Ruefle, Mary Gaitskill, Tom Piazza, Chris Abani, and John D'Agata.

Elizabeth Blackwell Award
In honor of Dr. Elizabeth Blackwell (1821-1910), the first woman in America to receive the Doctor of Medicine degree, the Elizabeth Blackwell Award is given by Hobart and William Smith Colleges to a woman whose life exemplifies outstanding service to humanity. Its recipients have included Chair of the Federal Reserve Janet Yellen (2015); the Most Rev. Katharine Jefferts Schori (2013); Eunice Kennedy Shriver (2011); first woman ordained a rabbi in the United States, Rabbi Sally Priesand (2009); Wangari Maathai (2008), first African woman to receive the Nobel Prize; the first woman to be ordained to the episcopate in the worldwide Anglican Communion, Bishop Barbara Harris (2004); Secretary of State Madeleine Albright (2001); tennis great Billie Jean King (1998); Wilma Mankiller (1996), first woman chief of the Cherokee Nation; U.S. Representative Barbara Jordan (1993); U.S. Senator Margaret Chase Smith (1991); former Surgeon General Antonia Novello (1991); Supreme Court Justice Sandra Day O'Connor (1985); Fe del Mundo, the first Asian woman admitted to Harvard Medical School (1966); Miki Sawada, who started an orphanage for abandoned mixed-race children (1960); among many others.

President's Forum
Each semester, Hobart and William Smith sponsors a series of guest lectures. The most prominent has been the President's Forum, established in 2000 and led by former president Mark Gearan. The forum has included The Hon. Shireen Avis Fisher, Nancy Zimpher, Mary Matalin and James Carville, Kathy Platoni, Svante Myrick, Cornel West, Ralph Nader, Hillary Clinton, Eric Liu, and Alan Keyes, among other prominent names.

Publications
Seneca Review, founded in 1970 by James Crenner and Ira Sadoff, is published twice yearly, spring and fall, by Hobart and William Smith Colleges Press. Distributed internationally, the magazine's emphasis is poetry, and the editors have a special interest in translations of contemporary poetry from around the world. Publisher of numerous laureates and award-winning poets, including Seamus Heaney, Rita Dove, Jorie Graham, Yusef Komunyakaa, Lisel Mueller, Wislawa Szymborska, Charles Simic, W.S. Merwin, and Eavan Boland, Seneca Review also consistently publishes emerging writers. In 1997, Seneca Review began publishing the "lyric essay," creative nonfiction that borders on poetry, under the associate editorship of John D'Agata.

Echo and Pine is the annual student-produced college yearbook. Originally two separate publications, the Hobart Echo of Seneca, and the William Smith Pine, the two merged in the 1960s to create one publication to serve both colleges.

The Herald is the student-run school newspaper, founded in the late 19th century as the Hobart Herald.

The Pulteney St. Survey is the official magazine of Hobart and William Smith Colleges.

martini is the alternative student publication at Hobart & William Smith Colleges featuring an oftentimes witty and critical look at music, politics and social issues on both the Colleges' campus and on the national level.

Thel provides an outlet for HWS student artists and writers. The bi-annual, student-run publication features poetry, photography, visual art and short stories created by HWS students.

The Aleph is a journal that expresses global perspectives by conveying the insights of HWS and Union College students who studied abroad in joint programs as well as international and exchange students from both campuses. The journal is sponsored by the Hobart and William Smith Colleges and Union College Partnership for Global Education.

Debate 
The HWS Debate Team dates back over 100 years.  Notable recent victories include the 2016 Cornell IV, the 2015 Brad Smith Debate Tournament @ University of Rochester, the 2012 US National Championships, and the 2012 and 2009 Northeastern Regional Championship. The team hosts the HWS IV (one of the largest tournaments in North America) each fall, and the HWS Round Robin (an international tournament of champions) each spring.  Every year, an HWS debater is honored with the Nathan D. Lapham Prize in Public Speaking, which comes with a cash award of up to $1000 to the student.  HWS is among the few liberal-arts colleges to offer numerous four-year debate scholarships.

Music

Hobart and William Smith has a number of ensemble groups, including:

Colleges Chorale, a mixed ensemble which performs a wide range of a cappella choral repertoire — music from the Middle Ages to the present. In addition to a formal concert at the end of each semester and the annual spring tour, the Colleges Chorale performs at various campus events throughout the year.

Cantori is a chamber vocal ensemble comprising members from the larger Colleges Chorale. Since the group's formation in 1993, the sixteen-member Cantori has sought to foster contemporary choral music through the Cantori Commissioning Project – the annual commissioning and performance of a new work by a deserving American composer.

Classical Guitar Ensemble - a student group providing a performance opportunity for talented student guitarists.

Community Chorus - students, faculty and staff at the Colleges, and members from the surrounding community. The fifty-voice ensemble performs major works from the standard repertoire as well as lesser-known works deserving wider familiarity. Recent programs have included extended works by Franz Joseph Haydn, Wolfgang Amadeus Mozart, Franz Schubert, Felix Mendelssohn, Gabriel Fauré, Ottorino Respighi, Sir Edward Elgar, Aaron Copland, Benjamin Britten, and Randall Thompson.

Community Wind Ensemble - students, faculty and staff at the Colleges, and members from the surrounding community. This relatively new ensemble looks forward to exploring the rich and diverse repertoire composed for wind ensemble.

Jazz Ensemble - a student group providing a performance opportunity for talented student jazzers. Arrangements are found to accommodate a variety of instrumental combinations.

Jazz Guitar Ensemble - a student group providing a performance opportunity for talented student jazz guitarists.

Percussion Ensemble - a student group providing a performance opportunity for talented student percussionists, although students with minimal experience are encouraged to audition.

String Ensemble - a student chamber group providing a performance opportunity for talented string players.

Hobartones - Hobart College's student-run all-male a cappella group.

Three Miles Lost - William Smith College's student-run all-female a cappella group

Perfect Third - HWS's student run, coed a cappella group.

Coordinate system
Founded as two separate colleges, Hobart for men in 1822 and William Smith for women in 1908, Hobart and William Smith Colleges preserve their own identities while benefiting from a shared campus, faculty, administration and curriculum. The Colleges welcome students of all gender identities.
 
The two colleges combined gradually. In 1922, the first joint commencement was held, though baccalaureate services remained separate until 1942. By then, coeducational classes had become the norm, and the curriculum centered on the idea of an across-the-board education, encouraging students and faculty to consider their studies from several points of view.
In 1943, during the administration of President John Milton Potter, William Smith College was elevated from its original status as a department of Hobart College to that of an independent college, on equal footing with Hobart.
Today, Hobart and William Smith students retain their own deans, athletic departments and student governments. Each college celebrates its history through a series of time-honored traditions beginning when each student matriculates and lasting through graduation. Maintaining their traditional gender separation - Hobart College for men and William Smith College for women - the Colleges celebrate their position as one of the few remaining coordinate systems in the nation.

Coordinate traditions

Matriculation exercises 
Upon arriving to campus for orientation, students and their families are personally greeted by the president before signing their name in the matriculation book. On the eve of the first day of classes, new students are invited to attend matriculation ceremonies hosted by the Dean's Offices.

Academic excellence 
The Hobart and William Smith Dean's Offices recognize the academic and social achievements of their students at celebratory events each spring semester.
 Benjamin Hale Dinner - Students and distinguished alumni come together to recognize the best of Hobart student achievements.
 Celebrating Excellence Dinner - The academic achievements of William Smith students are recognized and new members of the Laurel Honor Society are inducted.
 Moving Up Day - Students gather by class at the top of William Smith Hill and process down The Hill with the seniors carrying a laurel rope. The event culminates with the passing of the laurel from the seniors to the juniors and all students “Moving Up.” Academic awards are given, new members of the Hai Timiai Honor Society are inducted and the Dean reflects on the year.

Honoring the colleges' founders 
In honor of John Henry Hobart and William Smith, the community gathers each year to mark the founding of Hobart College and William Smith College.
 Charter Day - The campus community commemorates the founding of Hobart College and the day on which a provisional charter from the State Regents of New York officially brought the college into being. New inductees are welcomed to the Hobart honor societies and a distinguished alumnus is invited to speak.
 Founder's Day - Students, alumnae, administrators and faculty members gather to celebrate the establishment of William Smith College and the achievements of its students. A notable William Smith alumna addresses the community and engages in a public dialogue.

Alumni/ae welcome 
Hosted by the Alumni and Alumnae Associations, soon-to-be graduates are officially welcomed into the alum community during graduation weekend.
 Hobart Launch - Each member of the Hobart class is given an oar in celebration of his alma mater, its heritage and the promise of a reciprocal lifelong bond.
 William Smith Welcome Toast - The William Smith seniors are toasted by the alumnae, plant a class pine tree and each member receives a pine tree charm in honor of the college's nurseryman founder.

Athletics

Varsity sports 
There are 23 varsity sports at Hobart and William Smith Colleges, with about 25% of students involved at the varsity level. Hobart sponsors 11 varsity programs (basketball, cross country, football, golf, ice hockey, lacrosse, rowing, sailing, soccer, squash, tennis), while William Smith also sponsors 12 varsity programs (basketball, cross country, field hockey, golf, ice hockey, lacrosse, rowing, sailing, soccer, squash, swimming & diving, tennis). Hobart and William Smith varsity teams have won 23 national championships and 104 conference championships, producing 665 All-Americans and 43 Academic All-America honorees. In March 2017, Hobart and William Smith were named to the "100 Best Colleges for Sports Lovers" by Money and Sports Illustrated.

History
Originally known as the Hobart Deacons, Hobart's athletic teams became known as the "Statesmen" in 1936, following the football team's season opener against Amherst College. The morning after the game, The New York Times referred to the team as "the statesmen from Geneva," and the name stuck. The nickname for William Smith's athletic teams comes from a contest held in 1982. Several names were submitted, but "Herons" was selected because of the strong and graceful birds that lived at nearby Odell's Pond. These ominous birds frequently flew over the athletic fields as the teams were practicing.

Affiliations
The colleges compete in NCAA Division III, with the exception of men's lacrosse, which competes in the Division I Atlantic 10 Conference (A-10). The colleges' main conference affiliation is with the Liberty League with the following exceptions: Hobart ice hockey competes in the New England Hockey Conference; Hobart lacrosse competes in the A-10; and William Smith ice hockey competes in the United Collegiate Hockey Conference..

Facilities
Hobart and William Smith recently finished construction on the Caird Center for Sports and Recreation, which is now home to most of its athletics teams.

Football
Offensive linesman Ali Marpet, drafted in the second round, 61st overall, of the 2015 NFL draft, is the highest-drafted pick in the history of Division III football. He was three-time All-Liberty League first team (2012, 2013, 2014), and 2014 Liberty League Co-Offensive Player of the Year—the first offensive lineman in league history to be so honored.

Field hockey
The William Smith field hockey team has captured three national championships, ascending to the top of Division III in 1992, 1997 and 2000.

Lacrosse
The Statesmen lacrosse team has compiled fifteen national championships (1 USILA, 2 NCAA Division II, and 13 NCAA Division III).

Sailing
The lone coed team, the HWS sailing team is a member of the Middle Atlantic Intercollegiate Sailing Association. In 2005, the Colleges won the Inter-Collegiate Sailing Association Team Race National Championship and the ICSA Coed Dinghy National Championship.

Soccer
The William Smith soccer team was the first Heron squad to capture a national championship, winning the 1988 title bout with a 1–0 victory over University of California, San Diego.

Crew
The Hobart Crew team has also found success, earning gold medals at the Head of The Charles Regatta, the ECAC National Invitational Regatta (most recently a gold in the 2nd varsity 8+ over the "Hometown Boys" of WPI in 2015), and the IRA National Championships.  While the Hobart Crew team has won gold in every event they have entered since the inception of rowing as a Liberty League Sport, they failed to win the team championships only once (2004.) The eventual champions, Rensselaer Polytechnic Institute, were known for having a large team and only able to defeat the Statesmen by securing a win in the 2nd Varsity 8+ – the only event that Hobart did not have an entry. However, over the past few seasons Hobart has fielded one of the most dominant 2nd Varsity 8's in school history.  The Crew Team took part in the Henley Royal Regatta in Henley, England in the summer of 2011, as well as the summer of 2015.

Rivalries 
Hobart's archrival in football is Union College. Other team rivalries include Rensselaer Polytechnic Institute (football, basketball); University of Rochester (football); Elmira College and Manhattanville College (hockey); Cornell University (one of the oldest in lacrosse) and St. John Fisher University, Syracuse University and Georgetown University (lacrosse); and University of Michigan (crew). William Smith has rivalries with St. Lawrence University (lacrosse, basketball, field hockey), Union College (soccer, field hockey, basketball, lacrosse), Hamilton College (field hockey, basketball and lacrosse) and Ithaca College (crew).

Greek life
Greek life has been integral to Hobart College historically. Hobart has several active Chapters of Greek societies. 
Delta Chi, Hobart Chapter;
Kappa Alpha Society, CH – NY Beta;
Kappa Sigma, Delta-Phi Chapter;
Phi Sigma Kappa, Psi Triton Chapter;
Theta Delta Chi, Xi Charge; 
Sigma Chi, Alpha Alpha Chapter; 
Chi Phi; 
Hobart used to be the home of several now inactive fraternities including, Alpha Delta Phi, Pi Lambda Phi, Beta Sigma, Phi Phi Delta, Sigma Phi Society, Tau Kappa Epsilon,Alpha Phi Alpha  and Phi Kappa Tau. In the fall of 2017, William Smith welcomed their first sorority, Theta Phi Alpha.

Controversies

1970 Coercion Charges 
Students and faculty of Hobart and William Smith Colleges were active during the anti-war movements in the late 1960s and early 1970s. On April 30, 1970, a group of first-year students threw three Molotov cocktails through the windows of the Air Force ROTC office located on the first floor of Sherrill Hall. The incident was incited by "Tommy the Traveler" an agent provocateur who worked for the Ontario County Police Department and the FBI. No one was injured and no significant damage was done to Sherrill Hall. In July that year, the Colleges were officially indicted on coercion charges in a landmark case in the history of higher education in the United States. The incident marks the first time in U.S. history where a college has been charged with criminal activities relating to a campus disorder. The Colleges were acquitted of all charges.

2014 Title IX Investigation 
On May 1, 2014, the U.S. Department of Education released a list of 55 colleges being investigated for potential violations of federal law regarding sexual assault and harassment complaints. The list included Hobart and William Smith Colleges.  A New York Times article published in July of the same year detailed a case in which a student reported a sexual assault by three college football players two weeks into her first year; within two weeks the college's investigation cleared the two men accused, despite medical evidence, a corroborating witness to one of the incidents and discrepancies in the alleged perpetrators' accounts of the evening. The story also alleged the members of the disciplinary panel that heard the case were uninformed about sexual assault and frequently changed the subject rather than hear the victim's account of events. Following the report, the colleges unveiled new initiatives and policies, including revising their sexual violence policies, creating a rape hotline and forming an Office of Title IX Programs and Compliance.

Notable alumni

Notable alumni of Geneva Academy (1794–1822) 
 Ward Hunt, Associate Justice of the Supreme Court of the United States.
 DeWitt Clinton Littlejohn, United States Representative from New York and brigadier general in the Union Army.

Notable alumni of Geneva College (1822–1852) 
 General Edward Stuyvesant Bragg (1848) lawyer, United States Representative from Wisconsin, Union brigadier general of the American Civil War, envoy.
 
 Peter Myndert Dox (1833) lawyer; United States Representative from Alabama, 1869–1873.
 Charles J. Folger (1836) United States Secretary of the Treasury, Chief Judge of the New York Court of Appeals.

 Frederick S. Lovell (1835), member of the Wisconsin State Assembly. Union brigadier general.
 Albert J. Myer, MD (1847) father of the U.S. Army Signal Corps. A founding member of the International Meteorological Organization.

 David Rumsey, United States Representative from New York.
 Horatio Seymour (1823–1825) 18th Governor of New York, Democratic candidate for 1868 President.
 George Washington Woodward (About 1828) lawyer, U.S. Congressman of Pennsylvania and Chief Justice of the Supreme Court of Pennsylvania.

Notable alumni of Geneva Medical College (1834–1872) 
 Elizabeth Blackwell, MD (1849), first woman awarded a Doctor of Medicine degree in the United States.
 George W. Cole, MD (1850), brigadier general in the Union army; charged with murder.
 Moses Gunn, MD (1846), original faculty member and holder of the first chair of surgery at the University of Michigan Medical School, surgeon of the 5th Michigan Infantry and went through the Peninsular Campaign with Gen. George B. McClellan’s army. 
 Robert Mitchell, MD (1845), Wisconsin physician, Civil War surgeon and member of the Wisconsin State Assembly.

Notable alumni of Hobart and William Smith Colleges

Academia
 Willis Adcock (1944), professor of electrical and computer engineering at the University of Texas at Austin.
 Willard Myron Allen, MD (1926), professor and chairman of the Department of Obstetrics and Gynecology at Washington University School of Medicine.
 William Watts Folwell (1857), first president of the University of Minnesota.
 John P. Grotzinger (1979), Fletcher Jones Professor of Geology at California Institute of Technology and chair of the Division of Geological and Planetary Sciences.
 Michael Ann Holly (1973), American art historian, Starr Director of the Research and Academic Program at the Sterling and Francine Clark Art Institute.
 Jacquelyn S. Litt (1980), Professor of Sociology and Women's and Gender Studies at Rutgers University and Dean of Douglass Residential College.
 Kay Payne (1973), Professor of Communication Sciences and Disorders at Howard University 
Elizabeth J. Perry (1969), Henry Rosovsky Professor of Government at Harvard University, director of the Harvard-Yenching Institute, fellow of the American Academy of Arts and Sciences, corresponding fellow of the British Academy, and recipient of a Guggenheim Fellowship.
 Edward Regan (1950), president of Baruch College from 2000 to 2004.
 Gregory J. Vincent (1983), president of Talladega College; former president of Hobart and William Smith Colleges; former executive director of the Civil Rights and Education Initiative and Professor at the University of Kentucky.
 Ralph Wyckoff (1916), Professor of Microbiology and Physics at the University of Arizona.

Arts
 Melissa Bank (1982), author of The Girls' Guide to Hunting and Fishing.
 Eric Bloom (1967), singer, songwriter, guitarist, and keyboardist, most recently of Blue Öyster Cult.
 Janet Braun-Reinitz (1973), president of Artmakers, Inc.
 Michael Burkard (1968), poet, recipient of the Whiting Award and the Jerome Shestack Poetry Award from the American Poetry Review, Guggenheim Fellowship in Poetry.
 Christian Camargo (Minnick) (1992), actor, various movies and series, including Dexter, Fast, Inc., All My Sons (Broadway).
 John D'Agata (1995), professor of English and director of Nonfiction Writing Program at University of Iowa, co-author of The Lifespan of a Fact.
 Arthur Dove (attended), early American modernist often considered the first American abstract painter.
 Brad Falchuk (1993), television writer, director, and producer best known for American Horror Story and Glee.
 Evelyn Tooley Hunt (1926), originator of American style of Haiku; her poem "Taught Me Purple" was the inspiration for the book The Color Purple by Alice Walker.
 Alan Kalter (1964), actor, announcer of the Late Show with David Letterman.
 Jessica Knoll (2006), novelist, author of best-seller Luckiest Girl Alive.
 Stephen Kuusisto (1978), American poet.
 Eric Lax (1966), author, biographer of Woody Allen and Humphrey Bogart, among others.
 Reynold Levy (1966), former president of Lincoln Center for the Performing Arts, former president of the Robin Hood Foundation.
 Christopher McDonald (1977), movie, television, and stage actor (Happy Gilmore, Requiem for a Dream, The Perfect Storm, Quiz Show).
 Greg Mullavey (1955), actor (Mary Hartman, Mary Hartman, The Rockford Files, Hawaii Five-O, iCarly).
 Mark Neveldine (1995), screenwriter and director of films such as Gamer and Crank.
 Leslie Peirez (1992), television producer.
 Lt. Col. Hunter "Rip" Rawlings IV (1994), U.S. Marine and New York Times bestselling author of Red Metal.
 Jonas Wood (1999), contemporary artist.
 Brock Yates (1955), editor of Car and Driver magazine, motorsport television commentator, and screenwriter of the film The Cannonball Run.

Business
 Abigail Johnson (1984), Fidelity Investments, CEO and President.
 Warren Littlefield (1974), head of programming for Sony Pictures Television and the former president of NBC Entertainment.
 Dan Rosensweig (1983), business executive; president and chief executive officer of Chegg.
 William "Bill" Scandling (1949), founder of Saga Corporation (sold to Marriott Corporation in 1986).
 Dana Telsey (1984), CEO, Telsey Advisory Group

Government and law
 Harold Baer Jr. (1954), judge of the United States District Court for the Southern District of New York.
 Richard Brown (1953), Associate Justice of the New York Supreme Court, Appellate Division, Second Department, and longest-serving District Attorney in New York City.
 Rodney Frelinghuysen (1969), U.S. Representative for New Jersey's 11th congressional district.
 Richard R. Kenney (1878) U.S. Senator, Delaware 1895–1900.
 Joseph M. Kyrillos (1982), New Jersey state Senator.
 Alan Lowenthal (1962), U.S. Representative for California's 47th congressional district.
 Edward Regan (1950), Comptroller of New York.
 Herbert J. Stern (1958), judge of the United States District Court for the District of New Jersey, United States Attorney, prosecuted Malcolm X killers.
 Ben Wattenberg (1955), speechwriter for Lyndon B. Johnson from 1966 to 1968 and adviser to Hubert Humphrey's 1970 Senate race. Served on the 1972 and 1976 Democratic National Convention platform committees.
 John Paul Wiese (1962), judge of the United States Court of Federal Claims.

Journalism
 Byron Andrews (1876), journalist, private secretary to President Ulysses S. Grant; received an honorary degree at Hobart in 1900.
 Holman W. Jenkins Jr (1982), The Wall Street Journal editorial board member, policy commentator.
 Milissa Rehberger (1993), news reporter, MSNBC.
 Laura Sydell (1983), digital culture correspondent for NPR.
 Ben J. Wattenberg (1955), journalist, PBS host, and former speech writer for President Lyndon Johnson.
 Bill Whitaker (1973), Emmy-winning CBS News correspondent for the CBS Evening News and 60 Minutes.
 Dorothy Wickenden (1976), executive editor of The New Yorker.
 Brock Yates (1955), editor-in-chief of Car and Driver magazine.
 Mark Zusman (1976), editor-in-chief of Willamette Week

Religion
 The Rt Rev. Albert Arthur Chambers (1950), seventh Bishop of Springfield, Illinois.
 The Most Rev. Michael B. Curry (1975), first African American Bishop and Primate of the Episcopal Church, presided at the wedding of Prince Harry and Meghan Markle.
 Thomas Frederick Davies, Sr. (1889), third Bishop of the Episcopal Diocese of Michigan 1889 – 1905.
 Arthur Wheelock Moulton (1897), Episcopal Bishop of Utah.
 The Rt Rev. George Elden Packard (1966), Episcopal Suffragan Bishop of the Armed Forces.
 Robert Rusack (1947), was the fourth Episcopal Bishop of Los Angeles, California.

Science and medicine
 Willis Adcock (1944), inventor of the silicon transistor, member of team that developed the atomic bomb.
 Willard Myron Allen, MD (1926), co-discoverer of progesterone with George W. Corner. Allen received the first Eli Lilly Award in Biological Chemistry in 1935. 
 Darrick E. Antell, MD (1973), New York plastic surgeon known for his studies on aging and twins.
 Harry Coover (1941), inventor of "super glue".
 Robert Peter Gale, MD (1966), leukemia and bone marrow disorders expert; coordinated medical relief efforts for victims of the Chernobyl nuclear power accident.
 John P. Grotzinger (1979), mission leader and project scientist for NASA's Mars Science Laboratory.
 Matt Lamanna (1997), paleontologist responsible for several major discoveries.
 Ralph Walter Graystone Wyckoff (1916), pioneer inventor of X-ray crystallography.

Sports

 Frank Dwyer (1889), Major League Baseball player.
 Jeremy Foley (1974),  athletics director at the University of Florida.
 Fred King (1937), the first Hobart Statesman to play in the NFL.
 Ali Marpet (2015), NFL football player. Drafted in the second round (61st overall) of the 2015 NFL Entry Draft, he is the highest-drafted pick in the history of NCAA Division III football. Starting left guard on the Tampa Bay Buccaneers team that won Super Bowl LV. Member of 2022 Pro Bowl Team.
 Pierre McGuire (1983), two-time Stanley Cup winner; hockey commentator for NBC Sports Network.
 Kent Smack (1997), 2004 Athens Olympic rower for Team U.S.A.
 Jon Wallach (1989), sports broadcaster, WEEI, WBZ-FM (The Toucher and Rich Show).

Honorary degree recipients
 Eric Andersen - Received in 2022
 Byron Andrews – Received in 1900.
 William Martin Beauchamp, S.T.D. – Received in 1886. Author on Native Americans, archeologist of New York State Museum
 William Robert Brooks – Received in 1898.
 William Jefferson Clinton - Received in 2017, in honor of President Mark Gernan's retirement from the Colleges.
 Nat King Cole – Received in 1965 (posthumous).
 Millard Fillmore – Received in 1850.
 Ulysses Prentiss Hedrick – Received in 1913.
 Henry Champlin Lay – A Bishop of the Episcopal Church in the United States of America, Diocese of Easton.
 Wangari Maathai – Received in 1994.
 George McAneny – Received in 1914. 
 Henry Ustick Onderdonk – Received in 1827. Bishop of Pennsylvania. Born 1789, died 1858.
 Fred Rogers – Received in 1985.
 Eleanor Roosevelt – Received in 1947.
 Franklin Delano Roosevelt – Received in 1929.
 B. F. Skinner – Received in 1972.
 Gloria Steinem – Received in 1998.
 Gulian Crommelin Verplanck – Received in 1834.
Kurt Vonnegut Jr. – Received in 1974. His commencement address is included in his book Palm Sunday.

Notable faculty

 Benjamin Fish Austin (1850–1933), Campaigner for Women's Education. Also a renowned proponent of the Spiritualism movement.
 William Robert Brooks (1844–1922), was an American astronomer who specialized in comet discovery and has some periodic comets named for him.
 Elon Howard Eaton, founded the biology department and was state ornithologist and author of bird books.
 William A. Eddy, President of Hobart College, 1942
 Mark Gearan, President of Colleges, former White House Deputy Communications Director for President Bill Clinton, and former Director of the Peace Corps
 Andrew Harvey, Professor of English and noted author on religion and mysticism.
 Susan Henking, President of Shimer College, Professor emerita, formerly professor of Religious Studies, Women's Studies, and LGBT Studies
 Matthew Kadane, Assistant Professor of History, main songwriter (along with brother Bubba) of Bedhead and The New Year.
 Daniel A. McGowan, professor emeritus.
 H. Wesley Perkins, Professor of Sociology and the author of "Father of Social Norms Marketing."
 William Stevens Perry (1832–1898), History Professor and President at Hobart College, Author and second bishop of the Episcopal Diocese of Iowa.
 Lyman Pierson Powell former President of Hobart College, author, lecturer and ordained priest.
 David Weiss, Professor of English and Comparative Literature, author of "The Mensch" and noted poet.

References

External links

 
 HWS Athletics website

 
Hobart College
Education in Ontario County, New York
Hobart College
Geneva, New York
Liberal arts colleges in New York (state)
Tourist attractions in Ontario County, New York
U.S. Route 20
Universities and colleges affiliated with the Episcopal Church (United States)
Private universities and colleges in New York (state)
New England Hockey Conference teams